Tapalqué is a town in the central region of Buenos Aires Province, Argentina. It is the administrative headquarters for Tapalqué Partido.

See also
Tapalqué Partido

External links

Populated places in Buenos Aires Province
Populated places established in 1863